Arthur Seymour McIntyre (29 May 1889 – 14 March 1945) was an English cricketer. McIntyre was a right-handed batsman.

McIntyre made his first-class debut for Hampshire in the 1920 County Championship against Essex. McIntyre played 28 first-class matches for Hampshire between 1920 and 1923, with his final match coming against Middlesex. In his 28 matches for the club he scored 493 runs at a batting average of 11.46, with a single half century score of 55.

McIntyre died at Nottingham, Nottinghamshire on 14 March 1945.

External links
Arthur McIntyre at Cricinfo
Arthur McIntyre at CricketArchive
Matches and detailed statistics for Arthur McIntyre

1889 births
1945 deaths
People from Hartley Wintney
English cricketers
Hampshire cricketers